Larry Coryell (born Lorenz Albert Van DeLinder III; April 2, 1943 – February 19, 2017) was an American jazz guitarist.

Early life
Larry Coryell was born in Galveston, Texas, United States. He never knew his biological father, a musician. He was raised by his stepfather Gene, a chemical engineer, and his mother Cora, who encouraged him to learn piano when he was four years old.

In his teens he switched to guitar. After his family moved to Richland, Washington, he took lessons from a teacher who lent him albums by Les Paul, Johnny Smith, Barney Kessel, and Tal Farlow. When asked what jazz guitar albums influenced him, Coryell cited On View at the Five Spot Cafe by Kenny Burrell, Red Norvo with Strings, and The Incredible Jazz Guitar of Wes Montgomery. He liked blues and pop music and tried to play jazz when he was eighteen. He said that hearing Wes Montgomery changed his life.

Coryell graduated from Richland High School, where he played in local bands the Jailers, the Rumblers, the Royals, and the Flames. He also played with the Checkers from Yakima. He then moved to Seattle to attend the University of Washington.

Career

In September 1965, Coryell moved to New York City, where he attended Mannes School of Music. After moving to New York, he listened to classical composers such as Bartók, Debussy, Ravel, Stravinsky, and Shostakovich.

He replaced guitarist Gábor Szabó in Chico Hamilton's quintet. In 1967–68, he recorded with Gary Burton. During the mid-1960s he played with the Free Spirits, his first recorded band. His music during the late-1960s and early-1970s combined rock, jazz, and eastern music.

In the 1970s, he led the group Foreplay with Mike Mandel, a friend since childhood, although the albums of this period, Barefoot Boy, Offering, and The Real Great Escape, were credited only to Larry Coryell. He formed The Eleventh House in 1973. Several of the group's albums included drummer Alphonse Mouzon.

He recorded two guitar duet albums with Philip Catherine. In 1979, he formed The Guitar Trio with John McLaughlin and Paco de Lucia. The group toured Europe briefly, releasing a video recorded at Royal Albert Hall in London entitled Meeting of the Spirits. In early 1980, Coryell's drug addiction led to his being replaced by Al Di Meola. In 1985, he recorded Together with fellow guitarist Emily Remler, who died in 1990. Starting in 2010, Coryell toured with a trio that included pianist John Colianni. Since 2008, Coryell toured in a duo with fusion guitarist Roman Miroshnichenko.

Personal life
Coryell was first married to writer-actress Julie Nathanson (1947–2009), daughter of actress Carol Bruce. She appeared on the covers of several of his albums (including Lady Coryell, Larry Coryell at the Village Gate and The Lion and the Ram) and later wrote the book Jazz-Rock Fusion, which was based on interviews with many of Coryell's peers, including Chick Corea and John McLaughlin. She also sang intermittently with Coryell, including one track on the 1984 album Comin' Home. The couple had two sons (Murali Coryell (b. 1969) and Julian Coryell (b. 1973), both professional guitarists) before divorcing in 1985. 
Thereafter, he had a brief romance with fellow jazz guitarist and artistic collaborator Emily Remler. 

In 1988, he remarried to Connecticut native Mary Schuler; they divorced in 2005. Two years later, he married his last wife, Tracey Lynn Piergross, in Orlando, Florida (where he resided later in life). Tracey is a singer/songwriter/performer who appeared on Larry's Laid, Back & Blues recording in 2006 on Rhombus Records. Coryell recorded one of Tracey's compositions, "First Day of Autumn" on his album The Lift in 2013 on Wide Hive Records.

After surmounting his alcohol and heroin addictions, Coryell practiced Nichiren Buddhism. He also attempted to introduce Remler (who struggled with opioid addiction until her death in 1990) to a more healthful lifestyle, as exemplified by jogging and taking vitamins.

In November 2016, Coryell condemned Donald Trump following his election to the presidency of the United States. "This is an unacceptable situation", he said to Bill Milkowski of DownBeat. "We cannot let all the work we've done as jazz musicians to help relationships between people … we can't let all that go to hell. And that's what this election is going to do. It'll take us back to the Dark Ages and people will think that it’s OK to be prejudiced again. Well, I don't accept it. We have to stand up. … [Trump is] an impostor, a huckster, and he's got to go. And because I'm a Buddhist I'm going to chant about it and try to turn poison into medicine, and just get deeper and deeper into my music."

Shortly after these comments were published, Coryell wrote to Downbeat to apologize and retract: "I am no longer angry about the election; I accept it. I have musician friends who did not vote my way. I have no place implying, as I did in the article, that their votes were insincere or illegitimate... Also—and this is very important—I believe that I have a responsibility to transcend politics, focusing instead on finding ways to touch people’s hearts through music. I never want to forget all the great players who mentored me in the art of demonstrating restraint regarding hot-button issues; these men and women advised me to exercise discretion, and to behave with exemplary humanity. ...My comments did nothing to further the cause of our music. I apologize."

Death
Coryell died of heart failure on Sunday, February 19, 2017, in a New York City hotel room at the age of 73. He had performed at the Iridium Jazz Club in Manhattan on the preceding two days.

Discography

As leader 
 Lady Coryell (Vanguard Apostolic, 1969) – recorded in 1968
 Coryell  (Vanguard Apostolic, 1969)
 Spaces (Vanguard Apostolic, 1970)
 Fairyland (Mega, 1971)
 Larry Coryell at the Village Gate (Vanguard, 1971)
 Barefoot Boy (Flying Dutchman, 1971)
 Offering (Vanguard, 1972)
 The Real Great Escape (Vanguard, 1973)
 Introducing Eleventh House with Larry Coryell (Vanguard, 1974) – recorded in 1973
 The Restful Mind (Vanguard, 1975)
 Planet End (Vanguard, 1975) – recorded in 1970, 75
 Level One (Arista, 1975)
 Basics (Vanguard, 1976)
 The Lion and the Ram (Arista, 1976)
 Aspects (Arista, 1976)
 Two for the Road with Steve Khan (Arista, 1977)
 Twin House with Philip Catherine (Elektra, 1977)
 Back Together Again with Alphonse Mouzon (Atlantic, 1977)
 Difference (Egg, 1978)
 Better Than Live with the Brubeck Brothers (Direct-Disk Labs, 1978)
 European Impressions (Arista Novus 1978)
 At Montreux with Eleventh House (Vanguard, 1978) – recorded in 1974
 Standing Ovation: Solo (Mood, 1978)
 Splendid with Philip Catherine (Elektra, 1978)
 Return (Vanguard, 1979)
 Tributaries (Arista Novus, 1979)
 Live! with Philip Catherine, Joachim Kühn, (Elektra, 1980) – live
 Boléro (Philips, 1981)
 The Larry Coryell/Michael Urbaniak Duo (Keytone, 1982)
 Scheherazade (Philips, 1982)
 L'Oiseau de Feu, Petrouchka (Philips, 1983)
 Facts of Life with Michał Urbaniak (SWS, 1983)
 Just Like Being Born with Brian Keane (Flying Fish, 1984)
 Comin' Home (Muse, 1984)
 Together with Emily Remler (Concord Jazz, 1985)
 Equipoise (Muse, 1986) – recorded in 1985
 Dedicated to Bill Evans and Scott La Faro with Miroslav Vitous (Jazzpoint, 1987)
 Air Dancing (Jazzpoint, 1988)
 Toku Do (Muse, 1988)
 Dragon Gate (Shanachie, 1989)
 Visions in Blue: Coryell Plays Ravel & Gershwin (Little Major, 1989)
 Shining Hour (Muse, 1989)
 American Odyssey (DRG, 1990)
 Don Lanphere/Larry Coryell (Hep, 1990)
 Twelve Frets to One Octave (Shanachie, 1991)
 Live from Bahia (CTI, 1992) – live
 Fallen Angel (CTI, 1993)
 I'll Be Over You (CTI, 1995)
 Spaces Revisited (Shanachie, 1997)
 Cause and Effect with Steve Smith, Tom Coster, (Tone Center, 1998)
 Private Concert (Acoutic Music Records, 1999)
 Monk, Trane, Miles & Me (HighNote, 1999)
 From the Ashes with L. Subramaniam (Water Lily Acoustics, 1999)
 The Coryells (Chesky, 2000)
 New High (HighNote, 2000)
 Moonlight Whispers (Pastels, 2001)
 Count's Jam Band Reunion with Steve Marcus, Steve Smith, Kai Eckhardt (Tone Center, 2001)
 Inner Urge (HighNote, 2001)
 Cedars of Avalon (HighNote, 2002)
 Tricycles (In+Out, 2003)
 The Power Trio Live in Chicago (HighNote, 2003) – live
 Three Guitars with Badi Assad, John Abercrombie (Chesky, 2003)
 Electric with Victor Bailey, Lenny White (Chesky, 2005)
 Traffic with Victor Bailey, Lenny White (Chesky, 2006)
 Laid Back & Blues (Rhombus, 2006)
 Impressions: The New York Sessions (Chesky, 2008)
 Earthquake at the Avalon (In-Akustik, 2009)
 Montgomery (Patuxent Music, 2011)
 Larry Coryell with the Wide Hive Players (Wide Hive, 2011)
 Duality with Kenny Drew Jr. (Random Act, 2011)
 The Lift (Wide Hive, 2013)
 Heavy Feel (Wide Hive, 2015)
 Barefoot Man: Sanpaku (Purple Pyramid, 2016)
 Seven Secrets with Eleventh House (Savoy, 2016)
 Last Swing with Ireland Larry Coryell Trio (Angel Air, 2021)
 Live At The Sugar Club  Larry Coryell Trio (Angel Air, 2022) – live

As member 
The Free Spirits
 Out of Sight and Sound (ABC, 1967)
 Live at the Scene (Sunbeam, 2011) – live

Fuse One
 Fuse One (CTI, 1980)
 Ice (Electric Bird, 1984)

As sideman 

With Gary Burton
 Duster (RCA Victor, 1967)
 Lofty Fake Anagram (RCA Victor, 1967)
 Gary Burton Quartet in Concert (RCA Victor, 1968)
 A Genuine Tong Funeral (RCAVictor, 1968)

With Paco de Lucia
 Castro Marín (Philips, 1981)
 Entre Dos Aguas (Philips, 1983)

With Teo Macero
 Impressions of Charles Mingus (Palo Alto, 1983)
 Acoustical Suspension (Doctor Jazz, 1985)

With Leslie Mándoki
 Children of Hope (Gong, 1986)
 Out of Key... with the Time (Sony, 2002)

With Herbie Mann
 Memphis Underground (Atlantic, 1969)
 Memphis Two-Step (Embryo, 1971)
 Mellow (Atlantic, 1981)

With Steve Marcus
 Tomorrow Never Knows (Vortex, 1968)
 Count's Rock Band (Vortex, 1969)

With Charles Mingus
 Three or Four Shades of Blues (Atlantic, 1977)
 Me Myself An Eye (Atlantic, 1979)
 Something Like a Bird (Atlantic, 1980)

With Don Sebesky
 Don Sebesky & the Jazz Rock Syndrome (Verve, 1968)
 The Distant Galaxy (Verve, 1968)
 I Remember Bill (RCA Victor, 1998)

With L. Subramaniam
 Blossom (Crusaders, 1981)
 Spanish Wave (Milestone, 1983)
 Mani & Co. (Milestone, 1986)

With Leon Thomas
 Blues and the Soulful Truth (Flying Dutchman, 1973) – recorded in 1972
 Facets - The Legend of Leon Thomas (Flying Dutchman, 1973) – compilation

With Michal Urbaniak
 Fusion III (CBS, 1975)
 Miles of Blue (Sony, 2009)

With Kazumi Watanabe
 Dogatana (Better Days, 1981)
 One for All (Polydor Japan, 1999) – live

With others
 The 5th Dimension, Earthbound (ABC, 1975)
 Laurindo Almeida, Sharon Isbin, 3 Guitars 3 (Pro Arte, 1985)
 Jon Anderson, 1000 Hands: Chapter One (Opio Media 2019)
 Chet Baker,  Chet Baker / Wolfgang Lackerschmid (Sandra, 1980)
 Bob Baldwin, Cool Breeze (Shanachie, 1997)
 Randy Brecker, Score (Solid State, 1969)
 Charlie Byrd, Herb Ellis, Mundell Lowe, The Return of the Great Guitars (Concord Jazz, 1996)
 Royce Campbell, Six by Six (Paddle Wheel/King, 1994)
 Ron Carter, In Memory of Jim (Somethin' Else, 2014)
 Billy Cobham, By Design (Fnac Music, 1992)
 Tom Collier, Across the Bridge (Origin, 2015)
 Wolfgang Dauner, Knirsch (MPS, 1972)
 Joey DeFrancesco, Wonderful! Wonderful! (HighNote, 2012)
 Al Di Meola, Super Guitar Trio and Friends (TDK, 2001)
 Roman Miroshnichenko, Surreal (7Jazz, 2013)
 Tim Eyermann, Now & Then (Living Tree, 1998)
 Tal Farlow, All Strings Attached (Verve, 1987)
 Ricky Ford, Future's Gold (Muse, 1983)
 David Garfield, Jazz Outside the Box (Creatchy, 2018)
 Art Garfunkel, Up 'til Now (Columbia, 1993)
 Stu Goldberg, Solos-Duos-Trios (MPS, 1978)
 Stephane Grappelli, Young Django (MPS, 1979)
 Stefan Grossman, Friends Forever Guitar Collaborations (2008)
 Chico Hamilton, The Dealer (Impulse!, 1965)
 Roland Hanna, Gershwin Carmichael Cats (CTI, 1982)
 Donald Harrison, The Power of Cool (CTI, 1991)
 Jazz Composer's Orchestra, The Jazz Composer's Orchestra (JCOA, 1968)
 Fumio Karashima, Round Midnight (Full House, 1983)
 Ithamara Koorax, Ithamara Koorax Sings the Luiz Bonfa Songbook (Paddle Wheel 1996)
 Bireli Lagrene, & Special Guests (In-Akustik, 1986)
 Arnie Lawrence, Look Toward a Dream (Project 3, 1968)
 Bob Moses, Love Animal (Amulet, 2003)
 Michael Mantler, Movies (WATT Works, 1978)
 John McLaughlin, Paco de Lucia, Meeting of the Spirits (Alpha Centauri 1982)
 Alphonse Mouzon, The Sky Is the Limit (Tenacious, 1996)
 Mark Murphy, September Ballads (Milestone, 1988)
 Chico O'Farrill, Nine Flags (Impulse!, 1966)
 Anca Parghel, Jazz, My Secret Soul (Intercont Music, 1994)
 Jim Pepper, Pepper's Pow Wow (Embryo, 1971)
 Sonny Rollins, Don't Ask (Milestone, 1979)
 Sigi Schwab, Solo's Duo's and Trio's (Keytone, 1982)
 Dylan Taylor, One in Mind (Blujazz, 2017)
 Bob Thompson, Wilderness (Intima, 1989)
 Brian Tarquin, Orlando in Heaven (Purple Pyramid 2017)
 Eddie Cleanhead Vinson, You Can't Make Love Alone (Mega/Flying Dutchman, 1971)
 Jack Walrath, Out of the Tradition (Muse, 1992)
 Jimmy Webb, And So: On (Reprise, 1971)
 Lenny White, Venusian Summer (Nemperor, 1975)
 Kazuhito Yamashita, The Four Seasons (BMG, 2004)
 Larry Young, Spaceball (Arista, 1976)
 Steve Smith, The Best of Steve Smith (ToneCenter, 2009)

Videography
 L. Subramaniam Violin From the Heart (1999) – directed by Jean Henri Meunier (includes a scene of Coryell performing with L. Subramaniam)
 Meeting of the Spirits /1979 (2003) – live performance in London featuring Coryell, John McLaughlin, and Paco de Lucia
 Super Guitar Trio and Friends in Concert /1990 (2005) – live performance featuring Coryell, Al Di Meola, and Biréli Lagrène
 Super Guitar Trio: Live in Montreux /1989 (2007) – live performance featuring Coryell, Al Di Meola, and Biréli Lagrène
 Three Guitars: Paris Concert /2004 (2012) – live performance featuring Coryell, Badi Assad, and John Abercrombie

Bibliography

References

External links
Larry Coryell Interview - NAMM Oral History Library (2008)
Larry Coryell: Blues and Beyond
 
 

1943 births
2017 deaths
People from Richland, Washington
People from Galveston, Texas
Educators from Texas
Jazz musicians from Texas
20th-century American guitarists
21st-century American guitarists
American jazz educators
American jazz guitarists
American Hindus
Converts to Hinduism
Arista Records artists
Chesky Records artists
Muse Records artists
Vanguard Records artists
The Eleventh House members
The Free Spirits members
Favored Nations artists
CTI Records artists
HighNote Records artists
Jazz musicians from Washington (state)